In mathematics, compactly generated can refer to:
Compactly generated group, a topological group which is algebraically generated by one of its compact subsets
Compactly generated space, a topological space whose topology is coherent with the family of all compact subspaces

Mathematics disambiguation pages